San Zenón is a town and municipality of the Colombian Department of Magdalena. It was founded in 1751 by Antonio de Mier y Guerra. On April 30, 1950, it was elevated to the category of municipality.

Politics

Administrative divisions

Corregimientos

Peñoncito
Palomar
Angostura
Bermejal
Janeiro
Santa Rosa
Santa Teresa
Guinea
El Horno
Puerto Arturo

References

External links
 San Zenon official website
 Government of Magdalena: San Zenón

Municipalities of Magdalena Department
Populated places established in 1751
1750s establishments in the Viceroyalty of New Granada
1751 establishments in South America